Pahmadan (also Romanized as Pahmadān; also known as Mīān Maḩalleh-ye Pahmadān) is a village in Rudboneh Rural District, Rudboneh District, Lahijan County, Gilan Province, Iran. At the 2006 census, its population was 1,745, in 474 families.

References 

Populated places in Lahijan County